Yevgeny Abramovich Baratynsky (11 July 1844) was lauded by Alexander Pushkin as the finest Russian elegiac poet. After a long period when his reputation was on the wane, Baratynsky was rediscovered by Russian Symbolism poets as a supreme poet of thought.

Biography 
A member of the noble , or, more accurately, 
Boratynsky family, the future poet received his education at the Page Corps at St. Petersburg, from which he was expelled at the age of 15 after stealing a snuffbox and five hundred roubles from the bureau of his accessory's uncle. After three years in the countryside and deep emotional turmoil he entered the army as a private.

In 1820 the young poet met Anton Delvig, who rallied his falling spirits and introduced him to the literary press. Soon the military posted Baratynsky to Finland, where he remained for six years. His first long poem, Eda, written during this period, established his reputation.

In January 1826 he married the daughter of Major-General Gregory G. Engelhardt. Through the interest of friends he obtained leave from the Emperor to retire from the army, and he settled in 1827 in Muranovo just north of Moscow (now a literary museum). There he completed his longest work, The Gipsy, a poem written in the style of Pushkin.

Baratynsky's family life seemed happy, but a profound melancholy remained the background of his mind and of his poetry. He published several books of verse which Pushkin and other perceptive critics praised highly, but which met with a comparatively cool reception from the public, and with violent ridicule on the part of the young journalists of the "plebeian party". As time went by, Baratynsky's mood progressed from pessimism to hopelessness, and elegy became his preferred form of expression. He died in 1844 at Naples,
where he had gone in pursuit of a milder climate.

Poetry 
Baratynsky's earliest poems are punctuated by conscious efforts to write differently from Pushkin whom he regarded as a model of perfection. Even Eda, his first long poem, though inspired by Pushkin's The Prisoner of the Caucasus, adheres to a realistic and homely style, with a touch of sentimental pathos but not a trace of romanticism. It is written, like all that Baratynsky wrote, in a wonderfully precise style, next to which Pushkin's seems hazy. The descriptive passages are among the best — the stern nature of Finland was particularly dear to Baratynsky.

His short pieces from the 1820s are distinguished by the cold, metallic brilliance and sonority of the verse. They are dryer and clearer than anything in the whole of Russian poetry before Akhmatova. The poems from that period include fugitive, light pieces in the Anacreontic and Horatian manner, some of which have been recognized as the masterpieces of the kind, as well as love elegies, where a delicate sentiment is clothed in brilliant wit.

In his mature work (which includes all his short poems written after 1829) Baratynsky is a poet of thought, perhaps of all the poets of the "stupid nineteenth century" the one who made the best use of thought as a material for poetry. This made him alien to his younger contemporaries and to all the later part of the century, which identified poetry with sentiment. His poetry is, as it were, a short cut from the wit of the 18th-century poets to the metaphysical ambitions of the twentieth (in terms of English poetry, from Alexander Pope to T. S. Eliot).

Baratynsky's style is classical and dwells on the models of the previous century. Yet in his effort to give his thought the tersest and most concentrated statement, he sometimes becomes obscure by sheer dint of compression. Baratynsky's obvious labour gives his verse a certain air of brittleness which is at poles' ends from Pushkin's divine, Mozartian lightness and elasticity. Among other things, Baratynsky was one of the first Russian poets who were, in verse, masters of the complicated sentence, expanded by subordinate clauses and parentheses.

Philosophy 

Baratynsky aspired after a fuller union with nature, after a more primitive spontaneity of mental life. He saw the steady, inexorable movement of mankind away from nature. The aspiration after a more organic and natural past is one of the main motives of Baratynsky's poetry. He symbolized it in the growing discord between nature's child — the poet — and the human herd, which were growing, with every generation, more absorbed by industrial cares. Hence the increasing isolation of the poet in the modern world where the only response that greets him is that of his own rhymes (Rhyme, 1841).

The future of industrialized and mechanized mankind will be brilliant and glorious in the nearest future, but universal happiness and peace will be bought at the cost of the loss of all higher values of poetry (The Last Poet). And inevitably, after an age of intellectual refinement, humanity will lose its vital sap and die from sexual impotence. Then earth will be restored to her primaeval majesty (The Last Death, 1827).

This philosophy, allying itself to his profound temperamental melancholy, produced poems of extraordinary majesty, which can compare with nothing in the poetry of pessimism, except Leopardi. Such is the crushing majesty of that long ode to dejection, Autumn (1837), splendidly rhetorical in the grandest manner of classicism, though with a pronouncedly personal accent.

References

Attribution

External links

 Collection of Poems by Yevgeny Baratynsky (English Translations)
 Poems of Yevgeny Baratynsky
 Recordings of Yevgeny Baratynsky's poems
 Darkness and Light: The Life of Russia's Philosopher-Poet, Evgeny Abramovich Boratynski, by Grant Hayter-Menzies
 Evgeny Baratynsky: The Skull (English translation by Ilya Bernstein)
 

1800 births
1844 deaths
People from Tambov Oblast
People from Kirsanovsky Uyezd
Russian nobility
Russian male poets
Romantic poets
Russian philosophers
Writers of Gothic fiction
18th-century people from the Russian Empire
19th-century writers from the Russian Empire
19th-century poets from the Russian Empire
Male writers from the Russian Empire
Poets from the Russian Empire
19th-century philosophers
19th-century male writers from the Russian Empire
Burials at Tikhvin Cemetery